In the GDR women's football clubs existed since the late 1960s. While local leagues existed since 1970 a national championship was first held in 1979 and a cup was incepted only in 1987.

History 
In 1968 the Bulgarian student Vladimir Zvetkov founded the first women's team as a division of BSG Empor Dresden-Mitte (today Dresdner SC). While several local functionaries were opposed to the idea of women playing football Zvetkov eventually was allowed to pursue his idea. The first women's football game in the GDR was held on 4 August 1969. Dresden defeated Empor Possendorf 2–0 in front of 1,600 spectators.

As women's football was not Olympic, thus not holding a promise of reputation, the local authorities did not patronize the sport, but treated it as a recreational activity. Despite this lack of governmental interest the pioneers from Dresden were able to incept a league of eight teams in 1970. By the end of 1971 the number of women's football teams had grown to 150. Supra-regional competitions were refused for several years until in 1979 a national championship was held for the first time. A cup was incepted in 1987 and a national league was founded in 1990, the last year of the GDR. The national football team was organized in 1989, its only game was a 0–3 defeat at the hands of Czechoslovakia on 9 May 1990 in Potsdam.

After the 1990–91 season the clubs from the former GDR were integrated into the German Football Association. The top two finishers from the only Oberliga season, USV Jena and Wismut Aue, were assigned spots in the Bundesliga, but both faced immediate relegation. In 1994 former GDR club Turbine Potsdam was promoted to the Bundesliga and has since won every major honour in women's club football, including the UEFA Cup in 2005.

Champions 
Key

Cup 
The Democratic Women's League Cup(German: Pokal des Demokratischen Frauenbundes) has been held from 1987 to 1991. As the name suggests the cup was donated not by the football association as its male counterpart, but by the Democratic Women's League of Germany. Few information is available about the competition, in particular of the first two seasons only the winners are known. In the short existence of the cup only Rotation Schlema was able to win the title twice.

External links 
 Frauenfußball in the GDR at FFArchiv (in German)

 

Women's football in Germany
Football in East Germany